Michael Anthony Garnham (born 20 August 1960) is a former English cricketer who played for Essex, Leicestershire and Gloucestershire as a wicket-keeper/batsman between 1979 and 1995.

While attending North Devon College in Barnstaple, Garnham was selected to tour India with an English Schools team in 1977-78. He also toured Australia with England Young Cricketers in 1978-79.

A highlight of his career came in 1985 when he helped Leicestershire to win the Benson and Hedges Cup, joining Peter Willey in an unbroken match-clinching partnership of 80 in the Final. He also played in the Essex sides which won the County Championship in 1991 and 1992, 

Garnham now lives in Halstead, Essex. He works in planning in rural north Essex.

References

External links
 

1960 births
Living people
English cricketers
Cricketers from Johannesburg
Leicestershire cricketers
Essex cricketers
Gloucestershire cricketers
Cambridgeshire cricketers
Devon cricketers
Minor Counties cricketers
Wicket-keepers